The Werribee Football Club, nicknamed the Tigers, is an Australian rules football club, based in Werribee. The club was formed in 1964 and currently plays in the Victorian Football League (VFL). It is the western-most Melbourne-based VFL club as of 2021.

History
The Werribee Football Club was established in 1964 as part of a bid to enter the Victorian Football Association in 1965. The new club was formed as an amalgamation of four local clubs which competed in the Werribee District Football League: Werribee South, Irish National Foresters, Services and Metro Farm. In the early years the team was in the second division, and had little success over that time. Geographically distant from all other clubs in what was then a small town partway between Melbourne and Geelong, the club was unable to attract many strong non-local players, and was considered "the lonesome battler" of the Association. Up to 1980, the club had struggled through its sixteen seasons in Division 2 for one finals appearance and four wooden spoons. Its sole success during this time was its victory in the 1978 lightning premiership; it was the only Division 2 club to win that competition during its eight-year existence.

The club embarked on a five-year plan in the late 1970s, which saw the club build its finances, improve its on-field performance to reach the finals in 1981, and open a $200k social club in 1980. This saw the club promoted to Division 1 in 1982, as part of the Association's merit-based restructure of the competition. The club was relegated after finishing last at the end of 1985. The club won the Division 2 minor premiership in 1987, but never won a premiership or even a finals match during its time in Division 2.

In December 1986, Werribee had been earmarked for exclusion under the Association's controversial Football Organisation Review Team (FORT) recommendations, which sought to rationalise the Association to a stronger twelve-club competition in a single division, but which were never formally enacted after being rejected by the clubs. However, after the VFA had contracted to a single division in 1989, Werribee began to enjoy on-field success, and Werribee was one of only two of the FORT review's excluded clubs to survive in the VFA beyond 1991, the other being Springvale.

The club played a major role in the finals during the early 1990s, winning the premiership in 1993, finishing as runner-up after winning the minor premiership in 1991, and playing in a total of five finals series from 1990 to 1995.

At the end of the 1995 season, the club faced another threat to its survival when the Victorian State Football League sought to align the VFA (which at that time renamed the VFL) with the TAC Cup, and needed only one western suburban team to align with the Western Jets. Werribee and Williamstown were ordered to merge; when they could not agree to terms, the VSFL decided to grant the remaining licence to Williamstown, resulting in Werribee's expulsion from the VFL. After Werribee supporters rallied and the club demonstrated a strong position to launch legal action, the VSFL reinstated Werribee's licence under then-unique conditions which left it as the only club without district and TAC Cup feeder teams. The conditions did not harm the club on-field, as it continued to perform strongly, reaching the finals for the next four years, including winning the minor premiership and making a losing Grand Final appearance in 1998. The club was later permitted to take on the Geelong Falcons as its TAC Cup feeder team.

Following the amalgamation of the AFL reserves and the VFL, Werribee entered a reserves affiliation with the AFL's Western Bulldogs, which lasted from 2000 to 2007. The alliance allowed the club to have access to Bulldogs players who were not selected in the senior team. During that time, the club reached a further two Grand Finals in the 2000s: in 2001 and 2005, but lost both. From 2008 until 2015, the club was part of a split-affiliation structure with the North Melbourne Football Club, whereby half of North Melbourne's reserve players were allocated to Werribee and half were allocated to North Ballarat. From 2016 and 2017, the club was fully affiliated with North Melbourne and have access to all North Melbourne reserves players.

In 2018, the club ended its on-field alignment with North Melbourne, becoming a standalone side again for the first time since 1999.

In August 2018, the club announced senior coach John Lamont would be standing down at season's end after five years at the helm. In September, Port Adelaide AFL premiership coach Mark Williams was announced as new senior coach on a three-year deal.

In December 2020, following the departure of Mark Williams to the Melbourne Football Club, the club announced Michael Barlow as Senior Coach for season 2021.

Team squad
1. Hudson Garoni
2. Oliver Hanrahan
3. Micheal Sodomaco
4. Tom Gribble (cc)
5. Nick Coughlan
6. Shaun Mannagh
7. Nicholas Hayes
8. Jack Henderson
9. Louis Pinnuck
10. Joe Maishman
11. Matt Hanson
12. Ariek Lual
13. Keegan Gray
14. Reuben William
15. Kye Declase
16. Tom Boyd
17. Aidan Johnson
18. Nathan Cooper
19. Charlie Ham
20. Harry Stubbings
21. Josh Porter
22. Bior Malual 
24. Jay Dahlhaus
25. Tom McCaffrey
26. Noah Gribble
27. Jesse Clark
28. Brady Rowles
29. Dominic Brew (cc)
30. Lucas Rocci
31. Ethan Jackson'
32. Sam Paea
33. Darcy Cassar
34. Jack Driscoll
35. Sam Clohesy
36. Saad El-Hawli
37. Logan Wagener
38. Harrison White
39. Emmanuel Ajang
40. Sam Witherden 
45. Connor Thar
49. Martin Brennan
50. Sam Conway

Honours

Club

Individual
 J. J. Liston Trophy (7): Anthony Eames (1991), Paul Satterley (1995), Michael Frost (1998), James Podsiadly (2008), Ben Ross (2012), Tom Gribble (2019, 2022)
 Jim 'Frosty' Miller Medal (3): Jack Aziz (1993, 1996), James Podsiadly (2005)
 Fothergill–Round–Mitchell Medal (3): James Puli (1997), Michael Barlow (2009), Josh Corbett (2018), Jake Riccardi (2019)
 J. Field Medal (Division 2 Seniors League Best and Fairest) (1): Stephen Sells (1988)

Club song
The club song is sung to the tune of the US Marines Hymn.

Lyrics 
From the playing fields of Melbourne

To the stands of Chirnside Park

We fight our battles to the end

And we'll surely leave our mark!

We're the Tigers of the VFL

And we sing in harmony;

We're the Tigers bold in black and gold

We're the boys from Werribee!

References

External links

 
 Full Points Footy Profile of the Werribee Tigers

Victorian Football League clubs
1964 establishments in Australia
Australian rules football clubs established in 1964
Sport in the City of Wyndham
Werribee, Victoria